Janick Robert Gers (born 27 January 1957) is an English musician who is best known as one of the three guitarists in heavy metal band Iron Maiden. He initially joined to replace Adrian Smith, but remained in the band after Smith rejoined.  Gers was previously a member of Gillan and co-founder of the band White Spirit in 1975.

Career
Gers began his career as the lead guitarist of the New Wave of British Heavy Metal band White Spirit -- appearing on their debut self-titled album in 1980 -- before leaving in 1981 to join Gillan, a group formed by then-former Deep Purple vocalist Ian Gillan. 

After Gillan disbanded, Gers undertook a Humanities degree before joining Gogmagog, which included former Iron Maiden vocalist Paul Di'Anno and drummer Clive Burr. The project would ultimately come to nothing. Gers would later contribute, and perform on, the track "View from the Hill" on former Marillion vocalist Fish's first solo album, Vigil in a Wilderness of Mirrors, released in 1990. In 1989 Gers was asked to record the song "Bring Your Daughter... to the Slaughter" with Iron Maiden vocalist Bruce Dickinson for the soundtrack to A Nightmare on Elm Street 5: The Dream Child -- this project then expanded into Dickinson's first solo album, Tattooed Millionaire.

During the recording of Tattooed Millionare, Gers was asked to join Iron Maiden in place of Adrian Smith. He has remained with the band ever since, even after Smith rejoined the band in 1999, contributing to a total of ten studio albums.

Influences, musical style, and performance style
Gers' playing style uses heavy distortion and is noted for having a very raw tone. He prefers alternate picking instead of playing legato using hammers and pull-offs. Gers' main influences are Ritchie Blackmore, Jeff Beck and Rory Gallagher. 

He is noted for his energetic stage presence, which often involves dancing, prancing, and performing tricks with his guitar, such as throwing it into the air and catching it.
However, his on-stage performance has drawn criticism from some.

He is also left-handed although he plays guitar right-handed; he can be seen signing autographs with his left hand in the Rock in Rio DVD.

Personal life
He has two children with his wife Sandra, and lives in Yarm, Teesside. Gers's father, Bolesław, was an able seaman of the Polish Navy and served on ORP Burza and ORP Błyskawica on which he came to England and later joined the Royal Navy. Gers has relatives in the Bydgoszcz area and Sośno village in Poland and visited them regularly as a teenager until 1977. Gers bought his first guitar during one of those visits, in a music store in Złotów close to Piła. Gers met his Polish family again after 34 years at a 2011 concert in Warsaw.

Gers is a fan of Hartlepool United and is a season-ticket holder in the Neale Cooper Stand at Victoria Park. Gers is a graduate of the English Martyrs School and Sixth Form College.

Gers had an uncredited part in the BBC drama The Paradise Club in 1990, appearing as the lead guitarist of a band called Fraud Squad. He appeared in the 2010 fan-made Iron Maiden documentary Maiden Heaven.

Musical equipment
Gers is a long-time proponent of the Fender Stratocaster. His guitars are typically black or white with rosewood fingerboards and Seymour Duncan JB Jr. and Hot Rails pick-ups. His favourite guitar over the years has been a black Stratocaster, equipped with JB Jr. pick-ups, which was given to him by Ian Gillan. Gers uses four different Fender Stratocasters, as well as a Gibson Chet Atkins semi-acoustic model for songs such as "Dance of Death". Gers is currently endorsed by Sandberg Guitars, and he uses a California ST-S tobacco hc-aged and a California ST-S creme hc-aged model on stage.

Like his bandmates, Dave Murray and Adrian Smith, Gers currently uses the Marshall JMP-1 preamp through a Marshall 9200 power amp. Preferring not to use foot-switches while playing, Gers' roadie operates his MIDI Foot Controller offstage. Favouring cables, Gers only uses a Shure UR4D wireless system when he throws his guitar around. He uses Ernie Ball Regular Slinky nickel-wound guitar strings, although he does not use the B string.

Discography

Iron Maiden

No Prayer for the Dying (1990)
Fear of the Dark (1992)
The X Factor (1995)
Virtual XI (1998)
Brave New World (2000)
Dance of Death (2003)
A Matter of Life and Death (2006)
The Final Frontier (2010)
The Book of Souls (2015)
Senjutsu (2021)

White Spirit
White Spirit (1980)

Gillan
Double Trouble (1981)
Magic (1982)

Gogmagog
I Will Be There (EP) (1985)

Fish
Vigil in a Wilderness of Mirrors (1990)

Bruce Dickinson

Tattooed Millionaire (1990)

Ian Gillan
Gillan's Inn (2006)

Notes

References

External links

 Iron Maiden's official website
 
 
 Gers' 2000 Iron Maiden Guitar Rig. GuitarGeek.com

1957 births
20th-century British guitarists
21st-century British guitarists
English people of Polish descent
English heavy metal guitarists
English rock guitarists
Gogmagog (band) members
Iron Maiden members
Rhythm guitarists
Lead guitarists
Living people
People educated at English Martyrs School and Sixth Form College
People from Hartlepool
White Spirit (band) members
Gillan (band) members